, also known as Selichl Ishu was an Okinawan martial artist. He studied Shitō-ryū karate as a student of Shinpan Gusukuma. Iju had a dojo in Osaka, Japan. He was the first teacher of Shūgorō Nakazato (from 1935–1940), who then went on to become a student of Chosin Chibana. The version of Gojūshiho kata practiced in Shōrin-ryū Shorinkan is credited to Iju and his lineage. The rest of Shōrin-ryū Shorinkan katas are derived from Chosin Chibana's lineage.

References 

Okinawan male karateka
Year of birth missing
Year of death missing